The  was a Japanese coin worth one fifth of a Japanese yen, as 100 sen equalled 1 yen. These coins were minted in silver during the Meiji era from 1870 to 1911.

History

Meiji coinage (1870–1911)
Twenty sen coins were first struck towards the end of 1870 (year 3 of Meiji) from a newly established mint at Osaka. This was initially done by engineers from the United Kingdom, as Japan did not have the technology or raw materials to manufacture new coins. The coins made during this time were not officially released for circulation until the following year (1871) after a new currency act was promulgated. Twenty sen coins along with twelve other denominations were adopted by the Meiji government in an act signed on June 27, 1871. This new coinage gave Japan a western style decimal system based on units of yen, which were broken down into subsidiary currency of sen, and rin. Twenty sen coins dated 1870 (year 3) were initially authorized to be struck in .800 silver, weighs 72.2 grains (4.68g), and has a 23.62mm diameter (0.93 in). The first design used is called , which had its features engraved by a commission of Japanese artists. This design features a dragon with an open mouth on the obverse, while the reverse has a paulownia decoration with a sunburst in the center with the chrysanthemum seal up on top. Twenty sen coins were initially legal tender only up to the amount of 10 yen which was fixed by government regulations. The amount of silver in the coin soon became an issue as their weight per face value became lighter than the silver 1 yen coin. An amendment to the new currency act was adopted in November 1872 (year 5) which intended to increase the weight of the twenty sen coin. This action was never carried out as the new currency act was amended again towards the beginning of the next year. Changes to the weight, size, and design of the coins were implemented in February 1873 (year 6) by Daijo-kan Declaration No. 46. The weight issue was resolved by adjusting the coin from 72.2 to 83.2 grains (5.4g), this step was done to avoid any public mistrust on the silver content. Twenty sen coins were also reduced slightly in size from 24mm to 22.42mm. The second design is called  as the sunburst on the reverse was replaced by a wreath. Latin script is used for the first time with "20 SEN" on the obverse under the dragon, and the medallic orientation was flipped.

It is recorded by Edward Reed that production of twenty sen coins continued until at least June 30, 1878. These coins were last dated 1877 (year 10), and could have been impacted from the Satsuma Rebellion. Only proof strikes were made for coins dated 1880 (year 13) for exclusive use in presentation sets. During the next few years, Japan experienced a sharp drop in prices and contraction of the economy in response to high inflation caused by the Satsuma Rebellion. Large amounts of devalued inconvertible notes were in circulation from the aftermath of the rebellion. The Bank of Japan was established in 1882 (year 15) to remedy the situation, and two years later convertible banknotes were issued. An imperial ordinance was issued in June 1885 stating that silver payments would be resumed after January 1, 1886. For reasons unknown there are no twenty sen coins dated 1889 or 1890 (year 22 and 23), during this time a special fund was created for the redemption in silver for all government notes. The Japanese government promulgated the "currency law" (Meiji 30 Law No. 16) in 1897 which replaced the previous "new currency act". This law abolished the silver yen at which subsidiary silver coins were previously fixed at, and officially switched Japan from a silver standard to a gold standard. No changes were made to twenty sen coins as they were re-established to their previous weight, size, and design. 

Production continued as the price of silver bullion remained steady throughout the rest of the century. This changed when silver bullion began to rise sharply in 1903 (year 36) which threatened to exceed the face value of the twenty sen coin. An amendment to the "currency law" was promulgated in March 1906 which lowered their size from 22.42mm to 20.3mm, and their weight from 5.4g to 4.1 grams. The third and final design used on these smaller coins is called  as a sunburst design on the reverse was restored. The wreath design previously used on the back side of the dragon coins was adopted for the obverse. Twenty sen coins were produced afterwards until 1911 (year 44), concluding the circulating portion of the series.

Taishō proposals (1918–1921)
Emperor Taishō was enthroned in 1912 following the death of Emperor Meiji. Coinage in general was impacted by World War I which broke out two years later, bringing Japan a booming economy due to a large trade surplus. The negative effects from this event included an increased demand for subsidiary coins which led to a coin shortage. Silver bullion was in high demand causing prices to rise above the face value of the twenty sen coin. The Japanese government responded by taking measures to temporary ban the export of silver. These efforts were ultimately unsuccessful which led to the issuance of 20 sen emergency banknotes in November 1917. As the price of silver rose, the issue of coinage was also addressed for twenty and fifty sen coins. The "currency law" was revised in May 1918 (Law No. 42) to lower the silver content in twenty sen coins to 72% silver and 28% copper. Other changes included a reduction in size from 20.3mm to 16.7mm, and in weight from 4.1 to 3 grams. The coins struck from 1918 to 1921 are known as  after the design featured on them. None of these proposed coins were ever released for circulation through the Bank of Japan as they were trial or pattern strikes. Twenty sen banknotes were last issued in 1919 and were allowed to circulate until their suspension on April 1, 1921. By this time, efforts to re-establish the twenty sen coin were abandoned as silver bullion rose above their face value again. Twenty sen coins were eventually demonetized at the end of 1953 when the Japanese government passed a law abolishing subsidiary coinage in favor of the yen. Currencies of less than one yen were rarely used by this time due to excessive post-war inflation.

Weight and size

Circulation figures

Meiji

The following are circulation figures for the twenty sen coin, all of which were minted between the 3rd, and 44th year of Meiji's reign. The dates all begin with the Japanese symbol 明治 (Meiji), followed by the year of his reign the coin was minted. Each coin is read clockwise from right to left, so in the example used below "一十二" would read as "year 21" or 1888.

"Year" ← "Number representing year of reign" ← "Emperor's name" (Ex: 年 ← 一十二 ← 治明)

Collecting
The value of any given coin is determined by survivability rate and condition as collectors in general prefer uncleaned appealing coins. Twenty sen coins make up a relatively short lived denomination which is confined to the Meiji era. The first coins minted use the Asahi Ryu or rising sun dragon design which only lasted two years (1870-1871). As with the other denominations, those with clear (deep) scales on the dragon's design are worth more than obscure (shallow) ones. Coins dated 1871 (year 4) also have two varieties which include the character 銭 (sen) with a missing stroke. As these coins are scarce they are valued more than double the price than those with the whole character present. Aside from the deep scales and this incomplete sen variety, average circulated coins from these two years can be obtained for 4,000+ yen. Those in uncirculated grades are considered to be rare with values in the tens of thousands of yen. The second design was much longer lasting in comparison as it was featured on coins from 1873 to 1905 (year 6 to 38). Another similarity with other denominations occurs here with the character "明" in Meiji's name on the obverse. Coins dated 1873 (year 6) either have both features separated as the first variety, or have a line connecting both the left and right features as the second variety. There are also coins that are missing a top stroke on the left feature creating an "open" appearance versus those with a completed stroke. Those with the second "connected" variety, and examples with a missing top stroke are worth more than their counterparts for this one year occurrence.

Twenty sen coins dated 1875 and 1876 (year 8 and 9) either have "long" ribbons or "short" ribbons at the bottom of the wreath design. The "long" ribbons can be deafferented from the "short" design as the ribbons look flatter with more noticeable V shaped tails. "Type 1" long ribbons are more valuable on 1875 dated coins, while "Type 2" short ribbons are more for 1876. Twenty sen coins dated 1875 (year 8) are worth higher prices in general anyway as their mintage is low. Some Japanese price guides do not assess the value of 1880 (year 13) coins as so few of them have survived. An estimate places the value of these coins in the millions of yen where they are sold at auctions. The production of twenty sen coins dated 1885 to 1905 (year 18 to 38) contains three key dates due to low mintage figures. These dates are: 1888, 1900, and 1901 (year 21, 33 and 34), and are valued in the tens of thousands of yen in average condition. Overall though, common years and dates for the second design type are valued in the low thousands of yen in average condition. Twenty sen coins with the third and final design used from 1906 to 1911 (year 39 to 44) were generally made in larger amounts. Only a few of these coins show serious wear from circulation as the distribution period was short. There is a single rarity here in the last date of the series (1911 aka year 44) as the mintage for that year was low. Twenty sen trial or pattern strikes made under Emperor Taishō are extremely rare and are valued in the millions of yen.

See also                     
Newfoundland twenty cents
Philippine twenty-centavo coin
Twenty-cent piece (United States coin)

Notes

References

Coins of Japan
Japanese sen
Twenty-cent coins